Fraisse is a French surname. Notable people with the surname include:

Anne Fraïsse (born 1959), French latinist, academic, and university president
Bernard Fraisse (born 1956), French billionaire
David Fraisse (born 1968), French rugby league player
Geneviève Fraisse (born 1948), French philosopher and historian
Paul Fraisse (1911–1996), French psychologist
Robert Fraisse (disambiguation), multiple people
Roland Fraïssé (1920–2008), French logician
Rémi Fraisse (1993–2014), French botanist
Yves Fraisse (born 1943), French rower

French-language surnames